Rebecca Macfie is a New Zealand author and journalist.

Background 
Macfie lives in Christchurch, New Zealand. She has a BA and Post Graduate Diploma in Arts in History from the University of Otago, and a Post Graduate Diploma in Journalism from the University of Canterbury. She has an adult son and an adult daughter.

Career 
Macfie has worked as a journalist since 1988. In 2007 Macfie joined the New Zealand Listener as a writer for the South Island. She has also wbeen published with The Star, The Press, National Business Review, Independent Business Weekly, North & South, Unlimited, and the New Zealand Herald.

In 2013 she published Tragedy at Pike River Mine: How and Why 29 Men Died, a non-fiction work on the Pike River Mine disaster that claimed 29 lives.

Awards 
For her work with the New Zealand Listener Macfie won the Magazine Feature Writer Business and Politics Award at the 2014 Canon Media Awards and the Magazine Feature Writer Business & Science Award at the 2013 Canon Media Awards. At the 2016 Canon Media Awards, Macfie won the 'Feature writing – politics' and 'Feature writing – health' categories, as well as the Wolfson Fellowship. In 2018, Macfie won the Voyager Media Award for 'Feature writing – business or personal finance' for two articles, on the environmental and economic risks of climate change, and the development of animal free protein.

In 2012 she won the Bruce Jesson Senior Journalism Grant to develop a book on the Pike River Mine disaster (later published as Tragedy at Pike River Mine). The book then won the 2014 NZSA E.H. McCormick Best First Book Award for Non-Fiction at the New Zealand Post Book Awards, the 2014 Bert Roth Award for Excellence in Labour History, and the Australasian Institute of Mining and Metallurgy media award.

References

External links 
 Official Twitter

Living people
People from Christchurch
University of Otago alumni
University of Canterbury alumni
New Zealand women journalists
Year of birth missing (living people)
New Zealand investigative journalists
New Zealand journalists